The Harmony 22 is an American trailerable sailboat that was designed by Chris Bjerregaard as a Midget Ocean Racing Club (MORC) racer and first built in 1977.

Production
The design was built by Harmony Yachts and Gloucester Yachts in the United States. Production started in 1977, with 37 boats completed, but it is now out of production.

Design
The Harmony 22 is a recreational keelboat, built predominantly of fiberglass, with wooden trim. It has a fractional sloop rig, a raked stem, a plumb transom, a transom-hung rudder controlled by a tiller and a retractable daggerboard. It displaces  and carries  of ballast.

The boat is normally fitted with a small outboard motor for docking and maneuvering.

The design has sleeping accommodation for four people, with a double "V"-berth in the bow cabin, two straight settees in the main cabin. The galley is located on the starboard side just aft of the bow cabin and has a sink. The head is located under the bow cabin "V"-berth on the starboard side. The companionway step is also a cooler.

See also
List of sailing boat types

References

External links
Photo of a Harmony 22

1970s sailboat type designs
Sailing yachts
Trailer sailers
Sailboat type designs by Chris Bjerregaard
Sailboat types built by Gloucester Yachts
Sailboat types built by Harmony Yachts